The 2019–20 Men's Volleyball Thailand League is the 15th season of the Men's Volleyball Thailand League, the top Thai professional league for men's volleyball clubs, since its establishment in 2005, also known as CP Men's Volleyball Thailand League due to the sponsorship deal with Charoen Pokphand. A total of 8 teams will compete in the league. The season will begin on 18 January 2019 and is scheduled to conclude in 2019. This season will be organized by the Thailand Volleyball Association (TVA) instead Thailand Volleyball Co.,Ltd. The season started.

Clubs

Personnel and sponsors

Managerial changes 

 TBA

National team players 

 Note :

: players who released during second leg transfer window;: players who registered during second leg transfer window;  →: players who left club after registered during first or second leg.

 TBA

 National team player quotas except from regulation

Foreign players 

Note :: players who released during second leg transfer window;: players who registered during second leg transfer window;→: players who left club after registered during first or second leg.

Transfers

First leg

Format
Regular seasons
First leg (Week 1–5): single round-robin; The eighth place will relegate to Pro League.
Second leg: (Week 6–9) single round-robin; The top four will advance to Final series and the seventh place will relegate to Pro League.
Final series
First leg (Week 10): single round-robin.
Second leg: (Week 11) single round-robin.

Standing procedure 
 Number of matches won
 Match points
 Sets ratio
 Points ratio
 Result of the last match between the tied teams

Match won 3–0 or 3–1: 3 match points for the winner, 0 match points for the loser
Match won 3–2: 2 match points for the winner, 1 match point for the loser

Regular seasons – First leg

First leg table

Week 1
Venue: MCC Hall The Mall Bangkapi, Bangkok 
Dates: 18–22 January 2020

|}

Week 2
Venue: MCC Hall The Mall Bangkapi, Bangkok 
Dates: 25–29 January 2020

|}

Week 3
Venue: MCC Hall The Mall Korat, Nakhon Ratchasima 
Dates: 1–5 February 2020

|}

Week 4
Venue: MCC Hall The Mall Korat, Nakhon Ratchasima 
Dates: 8–12 February 2020

|}

Week 5
Venue: Eastern National Sports Training Center, Pattaya 
Dates: 15–16 February 2020

|}

Regular seasons – Second leg

Second leg table

Week 6
Venue: MCC Hall The Mall Bangkapi, Bangkok 
Dates: 22–26 January 2020

|}

Week 7
Venue: MCC Hall The Mall Bangkapi, Bangkok 
Dates: 29 January–4 March 2020

|}

Week 8
Venue: Keelawes 1 Gymnasium, Bangkok 
Dates: 7–11 March 2020

|}

Week 9
Venue: MCC Hall The Mall Korat, Nakhon Ratchasima 
Dates: 14–15 March 2020

|}

Final series

Final series table

Week 10

Final Series Week 1
Venue: Keelawes 1 Gymnasium, Bangkok 
Dates: 21–23 July 2020

|}

Week 11

Final Series Week 2
Venue: MCC Hall The Mall Bangkapi, Bangkok 
Dates: 28–30 July 2020

|}

Final standing

Awards

Most Valuable Player
  Wanchai Tabwises (Nakhon Ratchasima The Mall)

Best Scorer
  Amorntep Konhan (RMUTL Phitsanulok)

Best Outside Spiker
  Wanchai Tabwises (Nakhon Ratchasima The Mall)
  Kittikun Sriutthawong (Diamond Food VC)

Best Servers
  Jirayu Raksakaew (Diamond Food VC)

Best Middle Blocker
  Kissada Nilsawai (Diamond Food VC)
  Aekkawee Bangsri (RMUTL Phitsanulok)

Best Setter
  Narongrit Janpirom (RMUTL Phitsanulok)

Best Opposite Spiker
  Janita Surath (Nakhon Ratchasima The Mall)

Best Libero
  Tanapat Charoensuk (Nakhon Ratchasima The Mall)

References

External links 

 
 

Thailand League
2019